Hough Green railway station is a railway station to the west of Widnes in Halton, Cheshire, England. It is recorded in the National Heritage List for England as a designated Grade listed building.

History

The station was opened for passengers and goods on 1 May 1874.

The station became a junction station on 1 July 1879 when Hough Green Junction was opened  to the east, the junction gave access to the Widnes loop line owned by the Sheffield and Midland Railway Companies' Committee, two of the three companies that jointly owned the Cheshire Lines Committee.

The station is located where the line is bridged by Liverpool Road, now the B5178. The main station building is of the "common twin-pavilion type adopted by the CLC" with a larger, two-storey, projecting pavilion forming a house and a smaller single-storey one. Linking them is an entrance hall, ticket office and three-bay iron-arcaded waiting shelter. The building is decorated with elaborately fretted bargeboards. The station was equipped with a carved stone drinking fountain.

It had two platforms, both accessed by steps and a ramp down from the road overbridge, the Liverpool bound platform could also be accessed from the road access to the station building, on either side of two running lines, the Liverpool platform had a siding at its back that was not available for passenger use There was a goods yard to the south of the lines and east of the station. The goods yard was able to accommodate most types of goods, including livestock, it was equipped with a five-ton crane. 

By 1894 the station was renamed Hough Green for Ditton and then renamed back to Hough Green on 6 May 1974. The station closed to goods traffic on 6 June 1964. The Widnes loop line closed on 5 October 1964.

Facilities
The station, like other Merseytravel stations, is staffed full-time (06:00 - 00:10 weekdays, 08:40 - 22:40 Sundays). There is a car park outside. Part of the station building is occupied by a taxi firm.

The eastbound platform features the original brick-built waiting room which is still in use.  Train running information is provided by automated announcements and digital display screens; there is step-free access only on the westbound side.

Services
Services operate approximately half-hourly (Monday-Saturday daytimes) in each direction, towards  and Liverpool Lime Street to the west and towards Widnes and Manchester Oxford Road in the east. Services are less frequent in the late evenings and on Sundays, usually every 60 minutes. Most services are operated by Northern Trains.

The station is within the Liverpool City Region with tickets issued by Merseytravel.

See also 
Listed buildings in Widnes

Footnotes

References

Bibliography

External links

Railway stations in the Borough of Halton
DfT Category E stations
Former Cheshire Lines Committee stations
Grade II listed buildings in Cheshire
Grade II listed railway stations
Northern franchise railway stations
Buildings and structures in Widnes
Railway stations in Great Britain opened in 1874